Roman Jebavý and Jaroslav Pospíšil were the defending champions, but Pospíšil did not participate this year. Jebavý played alongside Jan Šátral, but they lost in quarterfinals to Lubomír Majšajdr and Martin Zahrádka.

Andrej Martin and Hans Podlipnik won the tournament, defeating Wesley Koolhof and Matwé Middelkoop in the final, 7–5, 6–7(3–7), [10–5].

Seeds

Draw

Draw

References
 Main Draw

Svijany Open - Doubles
Svijany Open doubles